In computing, replace is a command that is used to replace one or more existing computer files or add new files to a target directory. Files with a hidden or system attribute set cannot be replaced using replace. The command lists all files that are replaced.

History
The replace command first appeared in MS-DOS 3.2 and has been included in most versions of MS-DOS and compatibles such as FreeDOS and PTS-DOS. DR DOS 6.0 includes an implementation of the  command. The FreeDOS version was developed by Rene Ableidinger and is licensed under the GPL. It is also included as a console command in IBM OS/2, Microsoft Windows, and ReactOS. The ReactOS version was developed by Samuel Erdtman and is licensed under the GPL.

Example
The following command updates the files in C:\delivery\ with the .exe files from C:\source\

C:\>replace "C:\source\*.exe" C:\delivery

See also
List of DOS commands
List of Unix commands

References

Further reading

External links

replace | Microsoft Docs

External DOS commands
OS/2 commands
ReactOS commands
Microcomputer software
Windows administration